Ian Aston (14 October 1938 – 10 November 1988) was an Australian rules football player in the Victorian Football League (VFL). He wore the number six guernsey. Known for his  speed, Aston played on the ball and also on the wing, playing one interstate match for Victoria in 1959.

He played 98 games and scored 22 goals for Fitzroy from 1956 to 1962, earning eight Brownlow Medal votes in the 1959 season.

References

1938 births
1988 deaths
Fitzroy Football Club players
Australian rules footballers from Victoria (Australia)